László Bödör (born 17 August 1933) is a Hungarian football forward who played for Hungary in the 1962 FIFA World Cup. He also played for MTK Budapest FC.

References

External links
 FIFA profile

1933 births
Hungarian footballers
Hungary international footballers
Association football forwards
MTK Budapest FC players
Footballers from Budapest
1962 FIFA World Cup players
Living people